The Breazova is a right tributary of the Râul Galben in Romania. It flows into the Râul Galben near Tuștea.

References

Rivers of Romania
Rivers of Hunedoara County